The 2012–13 season is Southern District RSA's debut season in the Hong Kong First Division League since their establishment. They will seek to avoid relegation in the Hong Kong First Division League, as well as to achieve a better result in the Senior Challenge Shield and the FA Cup.

Players

First Team Squad 
As of 3 March 2013.

Remarks:
FP These players are registered as foreign players.

Player with dual nationality:
  Wisdom Fofo Agbo (Local player)
  Landon Lloyd Ling (Local player, eligible to play for Hong Kong national football team)

Transfers

In

Stats

Overall Stats
{|class="wikitable" style="text-align: center;"
|-
!width="100"|
!width="60"|First Division
!width="60"|Senior Shield
!width="60"|FA Cup
!width="60"|AFC CupPlayoffs
!width="60"|Total Stats
|-
|align=left|Games played    ||  18 ||  4  || 2  || 1 || 25
|-
|align=left|Games won       ||  6  ||  2  || 1  || 0 || 9
|-
|align=left|Games drawn     ||  6  ||  0  || 0  || 0 || 6
|-
|align=left|Games lost      ||  6  ||  2  || 1  || 1 || 10
|-
|align=left|Goals for       ||  24 ||  4  || 2  || 0 || 30
|-
|align=left|Goals against   ||  27 ||  4  || 4  || 2 || 37
|- =
|align=left|Players used    ||  26 ||  18 || 17 || 14|| 271
|-
|align=left|Yellow cards    ||  39 ||  12 || 6  || 2 || 59
|-
|align=left|Red cards       ||  1  ||  0  || 0  || 0 || 1
|-

Players Used: Southern has used a total of 27 different players in all competitions.

Squad Stats

Top scorers
 As of 5 May 2013

Remarks:
1 Jonathan Carril scored 3 goals for Kitchee before joining Southern District in October 2012.

Disciplinary record
As of 19 May 2013

Captains

Competitions

Overall

First Division League

Classification

Results summary

Results by round

Matches

Pre-season

Competitive

First Division League

Senior Challenge Shield

Quarter-finals

Semi-finals

FA Cup

First round

Hong Kong AFC Cup play-offs

Remarks: 
1 The capacity of Aberdeen Sports Ground is originally 9,000, but only the 4,000-seated main stand is opened for football match.
2 Wofoo Tai Po's home match against Southern of FA Cup first round will be played at Kowloon Bay Park instead of Wofoo Tai Po's home ground Tai Po Sports Ground.

Notes

References

Southern District RSA seasons
Sou
Southern District RSA